The Royal Borough of Greenwich has over fifty parks and open spaces within its boundaries. They include:

 Abbey Wood Park
 Avery Hill Park
 Birchmere Park
 Bostall Heath and Woods
 Blackheath
 Charlton Park
 Eaglesfield Park
 East Greenwich Pleasaunce
 Eltham Common
 Eltham Park north & south
 Falconwood Field
 Fairy Hill
 Greenwich Park
 Horn Park
 Kidbrooke Green Park
 Maribor Park, formerly Royal Arsenal Gardens
 Maryon Park in Charlton
 Maryon Wilson Park in Charlton
 Oxleas Wood and adjoining Oxleas Meadow, Castle Wood, Jack Wood and Shepherdleas Wood
 Plumstead Common and the adjoining Winn's Common
 Plumstead Gardens
 Queenscroft Park
 Ridgeway
 Shooters Hill
 Shrewsbury Barrow
 Shrewsbury Park, Woolwich-Plumstead
 St Mary's Garden, Woolwich
 Sutcliffe Park
 The Tarn
 Well Hall Pleasaunce
 Wellington Park, Royal Arsenal, Woolwich
 Woolwich Common which includes Repository Woods

The Green Chain, a linked series of linear and circular walks, include some of those open spaces within Greenwich. The Chain originates at three points along the River Thames and stretches to Crystal Palace Park.

Avery Hill Park is one of 11 parks throughout Greater London chosen to receive money for redevelopment by a public vote. The park received £400,000 towards better footpaths, more lighting, refurbished public toilets and new play areas for children.

Riverside
Greenwich is a riverside borough, and one of the largest open spaces is the Thames itself, forming the northern boundary of the borough. A sign posted riverside trail forms a walkway for both pedestrians and cyclists.

Local nature reserves
Local nature reserves in the borough are: Gilbert's Pit, Maryon Park, Maryon Wilson Park, Oxleas Wood and Sutcliffe Park.

References

External links
 Greenwich parks and gardens
 The South East London Green Chain
 Avery Hill Park